Paul Gutty (4 November 1942 – 27 August 2006) was a French racing cyclist. He won the French national road race title in 1970.

References

External links
 

1942 births
2006 deaths
French male cyclists
Cyclists from Lyon